The 1971 Star World Championships were held in Puget Sound, United States in 1971.

Results

References

1971 in sailing
Star World Championships in the United States